A Shadow in Eternity is the first novel in the A Shadow in Eternity series written by Indian author Payal Dhar.
The book was first published in 2006 and was followed by its sequels The Key of Chaos in 2007 and The Timeless Land in 2008.

References

Young adult novels
2006 Indian novels